In quantum electrodynamics, the anomalous magnetic moment of a particle is a contribution of effects of quantum mechanics, expressed by Feynman diagrams with loops, to the magnetic moment of that particle. (The magnetic moment, also called magnetic dipole moment, is a measure of the strength of a magnetic source.)

The "Dirac" magnetic moment, corresponding to tree-level Feynman diagrams (which can be thought of as the classical result), can be calculated from the Dirac equation. It is usually expressed in terms of the g-factor; the Dirac equation predicts . For particles such as the electron, this classical result differs from the observed value by a small fraction of a percent. The difference is the anomalous magnetic moment, denoted  and defined as

Electron

The one-loop contribution to the anomalous magnetic moment—corresponding to the first and largest quantum mechanical correction—of the electron is found by calculating the vertex function shown in the adjacent diagram. The calculation is relatively straightforward and the one-loop result is:

where  is the fine-structure constant. This result was first found by Julian Schwinger in 1948 and is engraved on his tombstone.

The QED prediction agrees with the experimentally measured value to more than 10 significant figures, making the magnetic moment of the electron the most accurately verified prediction in the history of physics. (See Precision tests of QED for details.)

The current experimental value and uncertainty is:

According to this value,  is known to an accuracy of around 1 part in 1 billion (109).

Muon 

The anomalous magnetic moment of the muon is calculated in a similar way to the electron. The prediction for the value of the muon anomalous magnetic moment includes three parts:

Of the first two components,  represents the photon and lepton loops, and  the W boson, Higgs boson and Z boson loops; both can be calculated precisely from first principles. The third term, represents hadron loops; it cannot be calculated accurately from theory alone. It is estimated from experimental measurements of the ratio of hadronic to muonic cross sections (R) in electron–antielectron (e−–e+) collisions. As of July 2017, the measurement disagrees with the Standard Model by 3.5 standard deviations, suggesting physics beyond the Standard Model may be having an effect (or that the theoretical/experimental errors are not completely under control). This is one of the long-standing discrepancies between the Standard Model and experiment.

The E821 Experiment at Brookhaven National Laboratory (BNL) studied the precession of muon and antimuon in a constant external magnetic field as they circulated in a confining storage ring. The E821 Experiment reported the following average value

A new experiment at Fermilab called "Muon g−2" using the E821 magnet will improve the accuracy of this value. Data taking began in March 2018 and is expected to end in September 2022. An interim result released on 7 April 2021 yields  which, in combination with existing measurements, gives a more precise estimate , exceeding the Standard Model prediction by 4.2 standard deviations. Also, experiment E34 at J-PARC plans to start its first run in 2024.

In April 2021, an international group of fourteen physicists reported that by using ab-initio quantum chromodynamics and quantum electrodynamics simulations they were able to obtain a theory-based approximation agreeing more with the experimental value than with the previous theory-based value that relied on the electron–positron annihilation experiments.

Tau
The Standard Model prediction for the tau's anomalous magnetic dipole moment is

Composite particles
Composite particles often have a huge anomalous magnetic moment. The nucleons, protons and neutrons, both composed of quarks, are examples. The nucleon magnetic moments are both large and were unexpected; the proton's magnetic moment is much too large for an elementary particle, while the neutron, which has no charge, was not expected to have a magnetic moment.

See also
 Anomalous electric dipole moment
 G-factor (physics) (dimensionless magnetic moment)
 Electron magnetic moment
Gordon decomposition

References

Bibliography

External links

Overview of the g−2 experiment

 

Magnetic moment
Quantum electrodynamics
Quantum field theory
Standard Model